The 1943 Colorado College Tigers football team was an American football team represented Colorado College as a member of the Rocky Mountain Conference (RMC) during the 1943 college football season. In the war-torn 1943 season, the Tigers compiled a perfect 7–0 record, and outscored their opponents by a total of 199 to 27. Although they were only ranked once going into a contest, the Tigers were ranked on the AP poll for six weeks, rising to as high as 16th and finishing at 18th in the final poll.

Schedule

References

Colorado College
Colorado College Tigers football seasons
College football undefeated seasons
Colorado College Tigers football